Events from the year 1640 in England.

Incumbents
 Monarch – Charles I
 Parliament – Short (starting 13 April, until 5 May), Royalist Long (starting 3 November)

Events
 5 January – Parliament fixes a quorum of 40 for its proceedings to be transacted.
 12 January – Thomas Wentworth becomes Lord-Lieutenant of Ireland and Earl of Strafford.
 17 January – John Finch becomes Lord Keeper of the Great Seal.
 13 April – King Charles I summons the Short Parliament in an attempt to fund the Second Bishops' War against the Scottish Covenanters.
 17 April – John Pym makes a speech attacking the King in Parliament.
 4 May – Oliver St John calls on Parliament to outlaw ship money.
 5 May – the King dismisses the Short Parliament and prepares to attack Scotland.
 6 May – the Earl of Warwick, Lord Brooke, Lord Saye, John Pym, John Hampden, and Sir Walter Earle arrested.
 20 August – a Scottish Covenanter army invades Northumberland.
 28 August – Battle of Newburn: the Covenanter army defeats the English army.
 26 October – Treaty of Ripon signed between the King and the Covenanters.
 3 November – the Long Parliament is summoned; it will not be dissolved for 20 years.
 25 November – the Earl of Strafford imprisoned in the Tower of London.
 11 December – a crowd of 1,500 Londoners presents the Root and Branch petition to the Long Parliament, calling for the abolition of episcopacy in the Church of England.
 18 December – Archbishop Laud impeached for treason.
 undated – Habeas Corpus Act ("An Act for the Regulating the Privie Councell and for taking away the Court commonly called the Star Chamber") passed, abolishing the Star Chamber.

Births
 11 January – Sir Robert Burdett, 3rd Baronet, politician (died 1716)
 25 January – William Cavendish, 1st Duke of Devonshire, soldier and statesman (died 1707)
 6 February – William Campion, politician (died 1702)
 13 February – Richard Edgcumbe, politician (died 1688)
 29 February – Benjamin Keach, Particular Baptist preacher (died 1704)
 30 March – John Trenchard, statesman (died 1695)
 19 June – Thomas Widdrington, politician (died 1660)
 29 June – Elizabeth Stanhope, Countess of Chesterfield (died 1665)
 12 October – Sir Roger Twisden, 2nd Baronet (died 1703)
 18 October – William Stanley, Member of Parliament (died 1670)
 23 October – Elisabeth Pepys, née de St Michel, wife of Samuel (died 1669)
 28 October – Streynsham Master, colonial administrator (died 1724)
 5 November – John Verney, 1st Viscount Fermanagh, politician and merchant (died 1717)
 17 November – Barbara Palmer, 1st Duchess of Cleveland, née Villiers, a mistress of King Charles II (died 1709)
 7 December (bapt.) – Fabian Stedman, pioneer of change ringing (died 1713)
 13 December – Robert Plot, naturalist (died 1696)
 14 December – Aphra Behn, née Amis, Johnson or Cooper?, author (died 1689)

Deaths
 14 January – Thomas Coventry, 1st Baron Coventry, lawyer and judge (born 1578)
 25 January – Robert Burton, scholar (born 1577)
 17 March – Philip Massinger, dramatist (born 1583)
 22 March – Thomas Carew, poet (born 1595)
 28 April (bur.) – William Alabaster, poet and dramatist (born 1567)
 3 June – Theophilus Howard, 2nd Earl of Suffolk, politician (born 1584)
 20 October – John Ball, Puritan clergyman (born 1585)
 13 November – Laurence Chaderton, academic and churchman (born 1536)
 8 December – Princess Anne, daughter of King Charles I (born 1637)

References

 
Years of the 17th century in England